Arnold Rothstein (January 17, 1882 – November 6, 1928), nicknamed "The Brain", was an American racketeer, crime boss, businessman, and gambler in New York City. Rothstein was widely reputed to have organized corruption in professional athletics, including conspiring to fix the 1919 World Series. He was also a mentor of future crime bosses Lucky Luciano, Meyer Lansky, Frank Costello, Bugsy Siegel and numerous others.

Rothstein "transformed organized crime from a thuggish activity by hoodlums into a big business run like a corporation.  and gained notoriety as the person who first realized that Prohibition was a business opportunity, a means to enormous wealth, who "understood the truths of early 20th century capitalism (giving people what they want) and came to dominate them". His notoriety inspired several fictional characters based on his life, portrayed in contemporary and later short stories, novels, musical theater productions, and films, including the character Meyer Wolfsheim in The Great Gatsby.

Rothstein refused to pay a large debt resulting from a fixed poker game and was murdered in 1928. His illegal empire was broken up and distributed among a number of other underworld organizations and led in part to the downfall of Tammany Hall and the rise of reformer Fiorello La Guardia. Ten years after his death, his brother declared Rothstein's estate was insolvent.

Early life and education
Arnold Rothstein was born into a comfortable life in Manhattan, the son of an affluent Ashkenazi Jewish businessman, Abraham Rothstein, and his wife, Esther. His father was a man of upright character, who had acquired the nickname "Abe the Just". Arnold was highly skilled at mathematics, but was otherwise uninterested in school. His older brother studied to become a rabbi.

Rothstein was known to be a difficult child, and he harbored a deep envy of his older brother, Harry. Rothstein's father believed that his son always craved to be the center of attention and would often get frustrated when he was not.

As a child, Rothstein began to indulge in gambling, but no matter how often his father scolded him for shooting dice, Rothstein would not stop. In 1921, Rothstein was asked how he became a gambler, "I always gambled. I can't remember when I didn't. Maybe I gambled just to show my father he couldn't tell me what to do, but I don't think so.  I think I gambled because I loved the excitement. When I gambled, nothing else mattered."

Illegitimate career

By 1910, Rothstein, at age 28, had moved to the Tenderloin section of Manhattan, where he established an important casino. He also invested in a horse racing track at Havre de Grace, Maryland, where he was reputed to have fixed many of the races that he won.

Rothstein had a wide network of informants, very deep pockets from some among his father's banking community associates, and the willingness to pay a premium for good information, regardless of the source. His successes made him a millionaire by age 30.

1919 World Series
 
There is a great deal of evidence both for and against Rothstein being involved in the 1919 World Series fix. In 1919, Rothstein's agents allegedly paid members of the Chicago White Sox to "throw", (i.e. intentionally lose), the World Series to the Cincinnati Reds. He bet against them and made a significant profit in what was called the "Black Sox Scandal".

He was summoned to Chicago to testify before a grand jury investigation of the incident; Rothstein said that he was an innocent businessman, intent on clearing his name and his reputation. Prosecutors could find no evidence linking Rothstein to the affair, and he was never indicted. Rothstein testified:

In another version of the story, Rothstein was first approached by Joseph "Sport" Sullivan, a gambler, who suggested Rothstein help fix the World Series. Rothstein supposedly refused Sullivan's proposal but when he received Attell's offer, Rothstein reconsidered Sullivan's first offer. He figured that the competition to fix the game made it worth the risk to get involved and still be able to conceal his involvement. David Pietrusza's biography of Rothstein suggested that the gangster worked both ends of the fix with Sullivan and Attell. Michael Alexander concluded that Attell fixed the Series "probably without Arnold Rothstein's approval", which "did not prevent Rothstein from betting on the Series with inside knowledge".

Leo Katcher said that "all the records and minutes of the Grand Jury disappeared. So, too, did the signed confessions of Cicotte, Williams and Jackson.... The state, virtually all of its evidence gone, sought to get the players to repeat their confession on the stand. This they refused to do, citing the Fifth Amendment." Eventually, the judge had no choice but to dismiss the case. Katcher went on, "Thus, on the official record and on the basis of [State Attorney Maclay] Hoyne's statement, Rothstein was never involved in the fixing of the Series. Also, on the official record, it was never proved that the Series had been fixed." Despite the legal case against the ballplayer defendants being dismissed, all eight White Sox players named as trial defendants were permanently  banned from playing or participating as coaches in Major League Baseball (MLB) by the newly named first Commissioner of Major League Baseball, Kenesaw Mountain Landis. Despite all his denials, though, Katcher noted that "while Rothstein won the Series, he won a small sum. He always maintained it was less than $100,000. It actually was about $350,000. It could have been much – very much – more. It wasn't because Rothstein chickened out. A World Series fix was too good to be true – even if it was true."

1921 Travers Stakes
Under the pseudonym "Redstone Stable", Rothstein owned a racehorse named Sporting Blood, which won the 1921 Travers Stakes under suspicious circumstances. Rothstein allegedly conspired with a leading trainer, Sam Hildreth, to drive up the odds on Sporting Blood. Hildreth entered an outstanding three-year-old, Grey Lag, on the morning of the race, causing the odds on Sporting Blood, to rise to 3–1. Rothstein bet $150,000 through bookmakers, allegedly having been informed that the second favorite, Prudery, was off her feed. Just before post time and without explanation, Hildreth scratched Grey Lag from the starting list. Rothstein collected over $500,000 in bets plus the purse, but a conspiracy was never proven.

Prohibition and organized crime
With the advent of Prohibition, Rothstein saw the opportunities for business; he diversified into bootlegging and narcotics. Liquor was brought in by smuggling along the Hudson River, as well as from Canada across the Great Lakes and into upstate New York. Rothstein also purchased holdings in a number of speakeasies. Later he became the first to illegally import Scotch whisky in his own fleet of trans-Atlantic freighters. He knew that high-end booze would be the "chic thing to have."

With his banking support and high-level political connections, Rothstein soon managed to end-run Tammany Hall to the street gangs. Subsequently, his criminal organization included such underworld notables as Meyer Lansky, Jack "Legs" Diamond, Charles "Lucky" Luciano, and Dutch Schultz, whose combined gangs and double-dealing with their own respective bosses subverted the entire late 19th-century form of political gangsterism. Rothstein's various nicknames were Mr. Big, The Fixer, The Man Uptown, The Big Bankroll, and The Brain.

Rothstein frequently mediated disputes among the New York gangs and reportedly charged a hefty fee for his services. His favorite "office" was Lindy's, at Broadway and 49th Street in Manhattan. He often stood on the corner surrounded by his bodyguards and did business on the street. Rothstein made bets and collected debts from those who had lost the previous day. Meanwhile, he exploited his role as mediator with the city's legitimate business world and soon forced Tammany Hall to recognize him as a necessary ally in its administration of the city. Many historians credit him as the first successful modern drug dealer.

By 1925, Rothstein was one of the most powerful criminals in the country and had forged a large criminal empire. For a time he was the largest bootlegger in the nation, until the rise of George Remus. With a reported wealth of over $10 million (equivalent to $150 million in 2019) Rothstein was one of the wealthiest gangsters in US history, and is widely considered to be one of the founding fathers of organized crime in the United States.

Death
On November 4, 1928, Rothstein was shot and wounded during a business meeting at Manhattan's Park Central Hotel at Seventh Avenue near 55th Street. He died two days later at the New York Polyclinic Hospital in Manhattan.

The shooting was reportedly linked to debts owed from a three-day long, high-stakes poker game in October, for which Rothstein owed $320,000 (equivalent to $ million in ). He claimed the game was fixed and refused to pay. The murder was intended to punish Rothstein for failing to pay his debt. Gambler George "Hump" McManus was arrested for homicide, but later acquitted for lack of evidence.

According to Kevin Cook, author of Titanic Thompson, the poker game was fixed by gambler Titanic Thompson (born Alvin Clarence Thomas) and his associate, Nate Raymond. Due to some complicated side bets, by the end Rothstein owed $319,000 to Raymond (much of which Raymond, by secret agreement, was to pass on to Thompson); $30,000 to Thompson; and about $200,000 to the other gamblers present. McManus owed Rothstein $51,000. Rothstein stalled for time, saying that he would not be able to pay until after the elections of November 1928, when he expected to win $550,000 for successfully backing Herbert Hoover for president and Franklin D. Roosevelt for governor. Thompson testified at McManus' trial, describing him as "a swell loser" who would never have shot Rothstein. According to Cook, Thompson later told some of his acquaintances that the killer had not been McManus, but rather his "bag man", Hyman Biller, who fled to Cuba shortly afterwards.

In his book Kill the Dutchman!, a biography of Dutch Schultz published in 1971, the crime reporter Paul Sann suggested that Schultz murdered Rothstein. He says this was in retaliation for the murder of Schultz's friend and associate Joey Noe by Rothstein's protégé Jack "Legs" Diamond.

On his deathbed, Rothstein refused to identify his killer, answering police inquiries with "You stick to your trade. I'll stick to mine", and "Me mudder (my mother) did it." Rothstein was buried at Ridgewood's Union Field Cemetery.

Break-up of empire
At the time of Rothstein's death, Prohibition was in full swing, various street gangs were battling for control of the liquor distribution and the carefully constructed political boss structure of the late 19th century was in total collapse. Frank Erickson, Meyer Lansky, Bugsy Siegel and other former associates split up Rothstein's various "enterprises" after his death. With Rothstein's death, the corrupt and already-weakened Tammany Hall was critically wounded because it had relied on Rothstein to control the street gangs. With Tammany Hall's fall, reformer Fiorello La Guardia rose in prominence and was elected Mayor of New York City in 1933.

Ten years after his death, Harry Rothstein, Arnold's brother, declared Rothstein's estate insolvent and Arnold's wealth disappeared.

In popular culture

Literature
 Rothstein is referred to as "The Brain" in several of Damon Runyon's short stories, including a fictional version of his death in "The Brain Goes Home". As a newspaper reporter, Runyon came to know Rothstein personally and later covered the trial of his alleged killer. According to historian David Pietrusza, Rothstein was also the inspiration for the character Nathan Detroit, who appears in the short story "Blood Pressure" as well as the musical Guys and Dolls.
 In the novel The Great Gatsby, Meyer Wolfsheim is a Jewish friend and mentor of Jay Gatsby, described as a gambler who fixed the World Series. The character is commonly assumed to be an allusion to Rothstein.

Film and television
 In the 1930 film Street of Chance, William Powell played a gambler who is shot after cheating in a poker game. The film was widely recognized as being based on the murder of Arnold Rothstein.
 With the fictional name of Murray Golden, he was portrayed by Spencer Tracy in the 1934 film Now I'll Tell, loosely based on the autobiography of wife and widow Carolyn Green Rothstein (or "Mrs. Arnold Rothstein," as the film's title card reads).
 He was portrayed in the 1960 film The Rise and Fall of Legs Diamond by actor Robert Lowery.
 In the 1961 film The Big Bankroll (a.k.a. King of the Roaring Twenties: The Story of Arnold Rothstein) by David Janssen.
 In a deleted scene from the 1974 Academy Award for Best Picture winner The Godfather Part II, supporting character Hyman Roth is introduced to Vito Corleone, who suggests that he change his name, which was originally Hyman Suchowsky. When Vito asks him whom he admires, Suchowsky says Arnold Rothstein, for having fixed the 1919 World Series; accordingly, he changes his last name to Roth. 
 In the 1981 film Gangster Wars and series The Gangster Chronicles by George DiCenzo.
 In the 1988 sports drama film Eight Men Out by Michael Lerner. 
 In the 1991 film Mobsters by F. Murray Abraham.
 In the 1995 Martin Scorsese film Casino the protagonist, Sam "Ace" Rothstein, was named for Arnold Rothstein but modeled on real-life sports bettor and fixer Frank "Lefty" Rosenthal.
 In the 1999 biopic Lansky by Stanley DeSantis.
 In the HBO series Boardwalk Empire by Michael Stuhlbarg.

Associates 
 Waxey Gordon – worked as a rum-runner for Rothstein during the first years of Prohibition.
 Harry "Nig" Rosen – involved in narcotics with Rothstein during the mid-1920s.
Charles "Lucky" Luciano – viewed to have been mentored by Rothstein, who supported him early on in his career as a racketeer and taught him how to be a full-fledged kingpin. They are both among New York's most notorious gangster kingpins, and both are directly responsible for the modernization and subsequent public obsession with American organized crime.
Meyer Lansky – along with partner Luciano, he was somewhat mentored by Rothstein during Prohibition. Both Jewish Mafia members, they were instrumental in the rise and glorification of modern American organized crime.
Alfred Lowenstein, Belgian financier, with whom Rothstein allegedly had a deal to supply America with European made heroin.
Enoch "Nucky" Johnson – business partners during the bootlegging boom of the Roaring Twenties.

See also
Fuller case
List of unsolved murders
Seabury Commission

References

Sources

Further reading 
 Alexander, Michael (2003). Jazz Age Jews, Princeton University Press, 
 Cohen, Rich (1999). Tough Jews: Fathers, Sons, and Gangster Dreams, London: Vintage 
 Henderson Clarke, Donald (1929). In the Reign of Rothstein, New York: The Vanguard Press. 
 Katcher, Leo (1959/1994). The Big Bankroll. The Life and Times of Arnold Rothstein, New York: Da Capo Press 
 Pietrusza, David (2003). Rothstein: The Life, Times and Murder of the Criminal Genius Who Fixed the 1919 World Series, New York: Carroll & Graf. 
 Rothstein, Carolyn (with Donald Henderson Clarke) (1934), Now I'll Tell, New York: Vantage Press.
 Tosches, Nick (2005). King of the Jews. The Arnold Rothstein Story, London: Hamish Hamilton

External links 

 Victoria Vanderveer, "Arnold Rothstein and the 1919 World Series Fix". https://web.archive.org/web/20070929111828/http://www.forward.com/articles/arnold-the-brain/
 "Arnold Rothstein", Biography Jewish Virtual Library
 Daniel A. Nathan, "The Big Fix: Arnold Rothstein rigged the 1919 World Series. Or did he?", Legal Affairs, March – April 2004
 Arnold Rothstein Death
  Review of David Pietrusza, Rothstein: The Life, Times, and Murder of the Criminal Genius Who Fixed the 1919 World Series, Jewish Daily Forward, October 31, 2003
 
 Edward Dean Sullivan, "The Real Truth about Rothstein!" True Detective Mysteries, (October 1930) pp. 20–26, 76–80.

 
1882 births
1928 deaths
1928 murders in the United States
American crime bosses
Prohibition-era gangsters
Male murder victims
Murdered Jewish American gangsters
Criminals from New York City
Match fixers
People murdered in New York City
Deaths by firearm in Manhattan
Burials in Queens, New York, by place
Unsolved murders in the United States